The 2002 Troy State Trojans football team represented Troy State University—now known as Troy University—as an independent during the 2002 NCAA Division I-A football season. Led by 12th-year head coach Larry Blakeney, the Trojans compiled a record of 4–8. Troy State played home games at Veterans Memorial Stadium in Troy, Alabama.

Schedule

References

Troy State
Troy Trojans football seasons
Troy State Trojans football